Flippin may refer to:

 Flippin, Arkansas, United States
 Flippin, Kentucky
 Flippin (surname), an American surname

See also
 Flippin–Lodge angle
 Flipping
 Flip (disambiguation)